Sir John Potts, 1st Baronet (c. 1592–1673) was an English politician who sat in the House of Commons  from 1640 to 1648 and in 1660.

Potts was the son of John Potts and his wife Ann Dodge, daughter of John Dodge.  In November 1640, Potts was elected Member of Parliament for Norfolk  in the Long Parliament. He was knighted on 9 August 1641 and created baronet of Mannington in the County of Norfolk, on 14 August 1641. Nevertheless, he supported the Parliamentarian side and sat until he was excluded under Pride's Purge in 1648. 

In 1660, Potts was elected MP for Great Yarmouth in the Convention Parliament. 
 
Potts died in 1673 and was buried at Mannington, Norfolk.

Potts "was obliged to marry a daughter of — Goodsill, esq. a favourite at court, with a small fortune", according to a writer in the time of the Court of Wards, and had three daughters. He married secondly Ursula Spelman widow and a daughter of Sir John Willoughby of Risley, Derbyshire. They had three sons John, Francis and Charles and a daughter Ursula.

References

 

1590s births
1673 deaths
Year of birth uncertain
People from Itteringham
Burials in Norfolk
Roundheads
People from Great Yarmouth
English MPs 1640–1648
English MPs 1660
Baronets in the Baronetage of England
Members of Parliament for Norfolk